Proceedings of the National Academy of Sciences, India Section A: Physical Sciences is a peer-reviewed scientific journal of physical science. It is published by Springer on behalf of National Academy of Sciences, India four times a year, and is edited by Jai Pal Mittal.

Abstracting and indexing
The journal is abstracted and indexed in the following bibliographic databases:

According to the Journal Citation Reports, the journal has a 2017 impact factor of 0.754.

References

External links

Springer Science+Business Media academic journals
Multidisciplinary scientific journals
English-language journals
Publications established in 1930
Quarterly journals